Tripsta S.A. is the parent company of tripsta, airtickets and travelplanet24, online travel agencies that provide transportation services—including airlines, ferry and train - through their websites.

Tripsta S.A. operates in over 45 countries and territories and in over 34 languages.

History 
Tripsta S.A. was founded in 2005, originally under the brand name travelplanet24, by Philipp Brinkmann (CEO) and Kristof Keim (CCO) in Athens, Greece. In 2010, Tripsta S.A. was formed in response to European expansion.

By 2010, Tripsta S.A. entered its first foreign market (Poland) and by 2015 expanded to forty-five additional markets.

In 2014, the company received 3.5 million EUR in funding for growth from the European Investment Fund.

As of 2017, the company serves over one million customers and has gross bookings exceeding .5bn EUR.

Tripsta S.A. maintains its headquarters in Athens, Greece and has a remote office in Bucharest, Romania.

Suspension of operations 
Tripsta S.A. suspended operations, in particular issuance of new travel tickets in June 2018 due to a failure of its new business plan and subsequent inability to repay debts of up to 70 million euros to IATA and its members. As a result of this airtickets.gr converted its operation into a metasearch engine and travelplanet24 was restricted into selling solely ferry tickets. Additionally it aimed to close down their office in Romania affecting around 100 employees. Tripsta blamed partner Travelport for this outcome and initiated legal actions against it, with Travelport denying the accusations. Airtickets.gr founder Dimitris Kontogeorgos publicly blamed Tripsta for failing to protect the reputation of airtickets.gr, as he claimed that Tripsta allowed its financial problems to be linked to airtickets.gr.

Brands 
 Travelplanet24 (Operates solely in the Greek market)
 airtickets (Operates in 17 counties)
 NL Group (Operates in 4 counties)
 Tripsta (Operates in 46 counties)

Acquisitions 
In March 2015, Tripsta S.A. acquired and integrated its competitor airtickets®. The acquisition made Tripsta S.A. the largest ecommerce company in the country. It also consolidated the technology and customer base of the two companies, presenting a wide-reaching transportation offer.

References 

Companies established in 2005
Companies based in Athens